Quality Save is a chain of discount stores operating in northern England. The head office/store for Quality Save is in Swinton.

History
Quality Save was founded in 1974 by Bob Rudkin. He started off with an indoor market stall in Walkden, and a small shop in Farnworth. The company opened more outlets over time.

In 2010, stores began playing a clip every fifteen minutes reminding customers of their "Star Buy" deals, their cheap prices in comparison to pound stores, and the company's alcohol policy. These clips end with the company's name and their slogan: "Quality Save. Quality Brands – Quality Prices". In 2012, Quality Save closed an outlet in Barnsley to open a much bigger one a few feet down the road. They also closed a temporary unit in Urmston, and opened a new one in the Eden Square Shopping Centre.

In 2015, the Middleton branch of Quality Save was closed, and a superstore was launched in the ex Tesco unit next door. It was then confirmed that their biggest ever superstore would open in the beginning of 2017 in Walkden, the town where the company was first founded on a market stall. In February 2017, the biggest ever Quality Save store was opened in Walkden Town Retail Park. This store is over 20,000 cubic feet.
As of Thursday 26th January 2023 Quality Save was sold TJ Morris, owner of Home Bargains.

Stores
Quality Save has a total of twenty three stores. They can usually be found in major shopping streets and shopping centres. Stores range from small to medium outlets. Quality Save's largest store is in the Stretford Mall. They acquired some of the former outlets of Woolworths. Although the official slogan for the company is "Quality Brands – Quality Prices", the Quality Save stores carrying old signs display the Home Bargains slogan: "Top Brands – Bottom Prices".

Logo
Stores have a red and sky blue logo. They used to have a logo more similar to that of Home Bargains, later changed to avoid confusion between the two companies. Many Quality Save stores, however, retain the old logo.

Home Bargains
They are supplied for by TJ Morris Ltd. Because of this, Quality Save is often confused with Home Bargains.

TJ Morris acquired Quality Save on 30th January 2023 for an undisclosed sum.

References

1974 establishments in the United Kingdom
Companies based in Salford
Retail companies established in 1974
Retail companies of the United Kingdom
Variety stores
Discount shops of the United Kingdom